Robert Frederick Coleman (November22 1954March24, 2014) was an American mathematician, and professor at the University of California, Berkeley.

Biography
After graduating from Nova High School, he completed his bachelor's degree at Harvard University in 1976 and subsequently attended Cambridge University for Part III of the mathematical tripos. While there John H. Coates provided him with a problem for his doctoral thesis ("Division Values in Local Fields"), which he completed at Princeton University in 1979 under the advising of Kenkichi Iwasawa.
He then had a one-year postdoctoral appointment at the Institute for Advanced Study and then taught at Harvard University for three years. In 1983, he moved to University of California, Berkeley. In 1985, he was struck with a severe case of multiple sclerosis, in which he lost the use of his legs. Despite this, he remained an active faculty member until his retirement in 2013. He was awarded a MacArthur fellowship in 1987.

Coleman died on March24, 2014.

Research
He worked primarily in number theory, with specific interests in p-adic analysis and arithmetic geometry. In particular, he developed a theory of p-adic integration analogous to the classical complex theory of abelian integrals. Applications of Coleman integration include an effective version of Chabauty's theorem concerning rational points on curves and a new proof of the Manin-Mumford conjecture, originally proved by Raynaud.  Coleman is also known for introducing p-adic Banach spaces into the study of modular forms and discovering important classicality criteria for overconvergent p-adic modular forms.  With Barry Mazur, he introduced the eigencurve and established some of its fundamental properties. In 1990, Coleman found a gap in Manin's proof of the Mordell conjecture over function fields and managed to fill it in.  With José Felipe Voloch, Coleman established an important unchecked compatibility in Benedict Gross's theory of companion forms.

Selected works

 PhD thesis

References

External links
Robert Coleman's Home Page

Robert F. Coleman's facebook page
Matt Baker's blog: Robert F. Coleman 1954-2014

20th-century American mathematicians
21st-century American mathematicians
Harvard University alumni
University of California, Berkeley College of Letters and Science faculty
MacArthur Fellows
1954 births
2014 deaths